Lawrence Napoleon Jr. (June 11, 1922 – May 10, 2002) was an American baseball pitcher in the Negro leagues. He played with the Kansas City Monarchs in 1947.

A native of Marion, Louisiana, Napoleon served in the US Army during World War II. He died in Monroe, Louisiana in 2002 at age 79.

References

External links
 and Seamheads

Kansas City Monarchs players
1922 births
2002 deaths
Baseball players from Louisiana
Baseball pitchers
People from Marion, Louisiana
United States Army personnel of World War II
20th-century African-American sportspeople
21st-century African-American people